Christian de Chalonge (born 21 January 1937) is a French film director and screenwriter. He directed the 1971 film The Wedding Ring, which starred Anna Karina.

Selected filmography
 The Wedding Ring (1971)
 L'Argent des autres (1978)
 Malevil (1981)
 The Roaring Forties (1982)
  (1990)
 The Children Thief (1991)

References

External links

1937 births
Living people
French film directors
French male screenwriters
French screenwriters
People from Douai
Best Director César Award winners